Enslaved is a British-Canadian television documentary series, which premiered in 2020. The film explores various aspects of the history of slavery in the United States, including the efforts of actor Samuel L. Jackson to reconnect with his African heritage through DNA testing, diving projects to locate and recover shipwrecks in which at least two million African people captured by slave traders died before ever reaching North America, and explorations of the impact of the slave trade on economics, politics and culture through to the present day.

The series was created by Simcha Jacobovici and Yaron Niski, directed by Jacobovici and produced by Ric Esther Bienstock, Sarah Sapper and Felix Golubev. The series was broadcast in fall 2020 on BBC Two in the United Kingdom, CBC Television in Canada and Epix in the United States. In spring 2021 it was broadcast on RTE 2 in the Republic of Ireland.

The series won the Canadian Screen Award for Best History Program or Series at the 9th Canadian Screen Awards in 2021.

References

External links

2020s British documentary television series
2020s Canadian documentary television series
2020 British television series debuts
2020 Canadian television series debuts
Works about American slavery
CBC Television original programming
Canadian Screen Award-winning television shows